Aarne Anders Pohjonen (29 March 1886 – 22 December 1938) was a Finnish gymnast who won bronze in the 1908 Summer Olympics.

Gymnastics 

He won the Finnish national championship in team gymnastics as a member of Ylioppilasvoimistelijat in 1909.

Biography 

His parents were provost Jaakko Pohjonen and Amanda Maria Taube. He married Tyyne Matilda Riekki in 1925. She was an adoptive sister of Esko Riekki.

He completed his matriculation exam in the Jyväskylä Lyseo in 1904, and graduated as a Licentiate of Medicine from the University of Helsinki in 1914.

He started in the public sector as a medical intern and then worked as a physician up to the 1930s. In the military sector, he was a White Guard volunteer in the Finnish Civil War and then worked as a medical officer in the Finnish Defence Forces in 1918–1930, reaching the rank of lieutenant colonel (med.). He specialized in tuberculosis.

He sat in the city council of Vaasa in 1933–1938.

He received the following honorary awards:
 Commemorative Medal of the Liberation war
 Cross of Liberty, 4th Class; 1918
 Knight (Chevalier) of the White Rose of Finland, 1923

He died of cancer.

References 

1886 births
1938 deaths
People from Luhanka
People from Mikkeli Province (Grand Duchy of Finland)
Finnish male artistic gymnasts
Gymnasts at the 1908 Summer Olympics
Olympic gymnasts of Finland
Olympic bronze medalists for Finland
Olympic medalists in gymnastics
Medalists at the 1908 Summer Olympics
Sportspeople from Central Finland